The 1905 Australasian Championships was a tennis tournament played on Grass courts in Melbourne, Australia at Warehouseman's Cricket Ground. The tournament took place from 21 November through 25 November 1905. It was the inaugural edition of the Australasian Championships and consisted of a men's singles and men's doubles competition. The men's singles event had a field of 17 players and was won by Australian Rodney Heath.

Finals

Singles

 Rodney Heath defeated  Albert Curtis, 4–6, 6–3, 6–4, 6–4

Doubles
 Randolph Lycett /  Tom Tachell defeated  E.T. Barnard  /  Basil Spence, 11–9, 8–6, 1–6, 4–6, 6–1

References

External links
 Australian Open Official website

 
1905 in Australian tennis
1905
November 1905 sports events